Cirrhinus is a genus of fish in the family Cyprinidae, the carps and minnows. Members of this genus are native to freshwater in South Asia, Indochina and southern China.

Species 
There are about 10 species in the genus.

 Cirrhinus cirrhosus (Bloch, 1795) (mrigal carp)
 Cirrhinus fulungee (Sykes, 1839) (Deccan white carp)
 Cirrhinus jullieni Sauvage, 1878
 Cirrhinus macrops Steindachner, 1870 (hora white carp)
 Cirrhinus microlepis Sauvage, 1878 (smallscale mud carp)
 Cirrhinus molitorella (Valenciennes, 1844) (mud carp)
 Cirrhinus mrigala (Hamilton, 1822)	
 Cirrhinus reba (Hamilton, 1822) (reba carp)
 Cirrhinus rubirostris Roberts, 1997

References 

 
Cyprinidae genera
Cyprinid fish of Asia